The German National Badminton Championships is a tournament organized to crown the best badminton players in Germany.

The tournament started in 1953 in West Germany, and in 1961 in East Germany.

Past winners

West Germany

East Germany

Germany

References

External links
 Germany Deutscher Badminton-Verband e.V.

Badminton tournaments in Germany
1953 establishments in West Germany
Recurring sporting events established in 1953
Badminton
1961 establishments in East Germany
National badminton championships